Robbert Stephan Blaisse (12 July 1900 – 21 March 1959) was a Dutch rower. He competed in the men's eight event at the 1920 Summer Olympics.

References

External links
 

1900 births
1959 deaths
Dutch male rowers
Olympic rowers of the Netherlands
Rowers at the 1920 Summer Olympics
Rowers from Amsterdam